PremiAir may refer to:

Air Premia, a South Korean airline
Kendell Airlines, an Australian regional airline 1967–2001
MyTravel Airways, a British airline 1990–2008
Premiair, an Indonesian airline
PremiAir Aviation Services, a defunct UK airline formerly based at Blackbushe Airport, Yateley, Hampshire, England
PremiAir Racing, an Australian motor racing team
Sunclass Airlines, a Danish charter airline